Campeonato Sudamericano de GT  (Southamerican GT Championship) previously known as GT3 Brasil Championship, GT Brasil and Campeonato Brasileiro de GT  was a sports car racing series based in the Brazil organized by the SRO Latin America.

History
Starting in 2007, the GT3 Brasil Championship has been held in Brazil, also organized by SRO, with several veteran drivers racing in some events, such as former Formula One champions Emerson Fittipaldi and former Brazilian Stock Car champions Chico Serra and Ingo Hoffmann. Differently from the European series, GT3 Brasil accepts professional drivers, in a system where drivers are graded from A (International Driver) to D (Fully Amateur).

In 2010 the championship was renamed for GT Brasil and announced the creation of GT4 class. For 2012 season was introduce GT Premium class caters for older, such as the Dodge Viper Competition Coupe or Porsche 997 GT3 Cup S. The category losing the primary sponsor and change their name to Campeonato Brasileiro de GT. In 2013 the series became a South American championship.

Vehicles

The following chassis are currently in GT3 and GT Premium:
 Audi R8 LMS ultra
 Corvette Z06-R GT3
 Ferrari F430 GT3
 Lamborghini Gallardo LP520 GT3
 Lamborghini Gallardo LP560 GT3
 Lamborghini Gallardo LP600+ GT3
 Porsche 997 GT3 Cup S
 Porsche 991 GT3 Cup

GT4:
 Aston Martin V8 Vantage GT4
 Ferrari Challenge
 Lotus Evora GT4
 Maserati GranTurismo MC

Champions

See also
 FIA GT3 European Championship
 GT4 European Cup

References

External links
  (in Portuguese)

Sports car racing series
Auto racing series in Brazil
Recurring sporting events established in 2007
Group GT3
Motorsport competitions in Brazil